Catholic Theological Union (CTU) is a private Roman Catholic graduate school of theology in Chicago, Illinois. It is one of the largest Catholic graduate schools of theology in the English speaking world and trains men and women for lay and ordained ministry within the Catholic Church. It was founded in 1968, when three religious institutes united their separate theology programs to form one school. The institution has since gained the sponsorship of twenty-four religious communities. CTU is run and staffed by religious men, religious sisters, and lay men and women. International students constitute nearly one third of the student body. Communicators for Women Religious has office space at CTU in Chicago.

Notable current faculty 
Steven P. Millies, Professor of Public Theology with expertise in religion and public life in the United States and religion and politics
Antonio D. Sison, C.Pp.S., Professor of Systematic Theology with scholarly expertise in inculturation theory, intercultural theology, and theology and film studies
Laurie Brink, O.P., Professor of New Testament Studies with expertise in Pauline studies, biblical spirituality, and the spirituality of Roman Catholic women religious
Roger Schroeder, S.V.D., Professor of Intercultural Studies and Ministry with expertise in contextual theology, missiology, and the study of religious life
Carmen M. Nanko-Fernández, Professor of Hispanic Theology and Ministry with scholarly expertise in Latin@ theologies as well as theology and béisbol
C. Vanessa White, Associate Professor of Spirituality and Ministry with expertise in Black Catholic studies, African American spirituality, practical theology, and theologies of personal well-being and self-care.
Richard Fragomeni, Professor of Liturgy and Preaching, with expertise in homiletics, preaching and presiding, and Roman Catholic hagiology
Barbara E. Reid, O.P., current President of Catholic Theological Union and Professor of New Testament Studies with expertise in feminist exegesis
Malka Z. Simkovich, Associate Professor of Biblical Literature and Languages with expertise in Second Temple Judiasm and Rabbinic literature especially in the Intertestamental Period
Syed Atif Rizwan, Assistant Professor of Islamic and Interreligious Studies with expertise in the history of early Islamic jurisprudence, hadith studies, comparative Christian-Muslim ethics, and contemporary criminal justice reform 
Robin Ryan, C.P. Professor of Systematic Theology with expertise in theologies of suffering and theologies of priesthood

Notable former theologians and faculty
Stephen B. Bevans, S.V.D., scholar of mission and culture
John Dominic Crossan, scholar of the New Testament
Edward Foley, O.F.M. Cap., scholar of spirituality, liturgy, and music
John Jefferson Gros, F.S.C., scholar of Christian ecumenical studies (Adjunct Faculty Member)
Leslie J. Hoppe, O.F.M., scholar of the Old Testament
Daniel P. Horan, O.F.M., scholar of systematic theology and spirituality
Kevin J. Madigan, scholar of church history
John T. Pawlikowski, O.S.M., scholar of social ethics
Wayne Robert Teasdale, scholar and practitioner of interreligious dialogue (adjunct faculty member)
Zachary Hayes, O.F.M., professor of systematic theology

Publications
New Theology Review (NTR)
Theophilus: The Student Journal of Catholic Theological Union

References

External links
Official website

 
Educational institutions established in 1968
1968 establishments in Illinois
Seminaries and theological colleges in Illinois
Catholic seminaries in the United States
Graduate schools in the United States
Universities and colleges in Chicago